Castle Grove Township is a township in Jones County, Iowa.

History
Castle Grove Township was organized in 1855.

References

Populated places in Jones County, Iowa
Townships in Iowa